Hit Me, Baby, One More Time is a television entertainment show first broadcast on the British television network ITV and later, as a new version, by NBC in the United States; both were presented by Vernon Kay. During each programme, five former pop stars sing their biggest hit along with a cover version of a contemporary hit. Each week one winner is picked from each show by a phone vote (in the British version) or a studio-audience vote (in the American version), leading to the grand final when the overall winner can release a single featuring both songs (in the British version) or have $20,000 donated to a charity of their choice (in the American version). The show's title was derived from a line in the Britney Spears song "...Baby One More Time".

The show proved to be a summer hit for NBC hitting the top spot in the ratings on its first outing.

UK version

Week 1 (2 April) 

The first week heat was won by Tiffany.

Week 2 (9 April)

This heat was won by Shakin' Stevens.

Week 3 (14 April)

This heat was won by Carol Decker.

Week 4 (21 April)

This heat was won by Hue and Cry.

Week 5 (28 April)

This heat was won by Shalamar.

Week 6 (7 May)

This heat was won by Chesney Hawkes.

Week 7 (14 May)

This heat was won by 911.

Grand Final (21 May)

The final was won by Shakin' Stevens. A single was released with both "This Ole House" and a cover of "Trouble" by Pink, which got to number twenty in the UK Singles Chart in June 2005.

U.S. version
The American version of the show began taping on 1 June 2005 to air the following night, 2 June, on the NBC network. Winners were chosen by the studio audience and got a donation in their name to a charity of their choice.

1 -- Denotes artist who also appeared on the British version.

Week 1 (recorded 1 June; aired 2 June)

This heat was won by Arrested Development.

Week 2 (recorded 8 June; aired 9 June)

This heat was won by Vanilla Ice.

Week 3 (recorded 15 June; aired 16 June)

This heat was won by Irene Cara. Howard Jones won the phone in vote.

Week 4 (recorded 22 June; aired 23 June)

This heat was won by Thelma Houston. Glass Tiger won the online vote.

Week 5 (recorded 29 June; aired 30 June)

This heat was won by PM Dawn. Juice Newton won the online vote.

References

2005 British television series debuts
2005 British television series endings
2005 American television series debuts
2005 American television series endings
2000s American reality television series
American television series based on British television series
British music television shows
2000s British reality television series
ITV reality television shows
NBC original programming
Television series by ITV Studios